Down the Wind is a 1975 Australian film which marked the directorial debut of Scott Hicks. He made it shortly after graduating from university.

Plot
Photographer Simon Jess is given an assignment to shoot backgrounds in the Snowy Mountains.

Cast
David Cameron as Simon Jess
Penne Hackforth-Jones as Sara
Ross Thompson as Tom
Christina Mackay as Tina
Rod Mullinar as Reg

Production
The film was the second of two joint projects between Hicks and Kim McKenzie. They had previously made The Wanderer (1974) together.

The budget was mostly provided by the Film, Television and Radio Board of the Australian Council.

Release
Screenings of the film were minimal.

References

External links
Down the Wind at IMDb
Down the Wind at Oz Movies

Australian drama films
Films directed by Scott Hicks
1975 films
1975 drama films
1975 directorial debut films
1970s English-language films
1970s Australian films